The 1934–35 season was the 26th in the history of the Isthmian League, an English football competition.

Wimbledon were champions, winning their third Isthmian League title.

League table

References

Isthmian League seasons
I